William Combs may refer to:

William E. Combs of the Combs Method
Bill Combs, wrestler

See also
William Combe (disambiguation)
William Coombs (disambiguation)